Walford Anglican School for Girls is an independent, Anglican, day and boarding school for girls, located in Hyde Park, South Australia.

The school is non-selective and caters for approximately 550 students from ELC to Year 12, including 65 boarders.

Walford's motto is "Virtute et Veritate" which translates to "with Courage and Truth".

The school has a wide range of co-curricular activities and is just 4km from Adelaide CBD. Walford was the first all girls' school in Australia to offer all three programs of the International Baccalaureate (IB) and the first girls' school in South Australia to offer the IB Diploma (students are also welcome to study the SACE program).

There are 5 houses in Walford that provide the basis for pastoral care and opportunities for House-based community service activities.

Gordon (blue) 

Murray (yellow)

Cleland (green)

Fletcher (red)

Prince Rayner (purple and white)

History 

The school started in 1893 in Fisher Street, Malvern, in the home of the first headmistress, Lydia Adamson. In December 1912 Ellen Ida Benham purchased the school, and led it until her death in 1917. Mabel Jewell Baker, a senior teacher at the school took over as headmistress. In 1920 boarders were housed in a new property in Hyde Park, and later the school itself moved to this site. When Baker retired at the end of 1955 there were 450 students and a well-established boarding house.

In 1956 Walford was incorporated as a Church of England Girls' Grammar School and Nina Morrison, OBE became the first salaried headmistress. She was followed by Helen Reid AM (1972-1991) and then Marilyn Haysom (1992-2004).

In May 2004 Helen Trebilcock become the first Head of Walford to use the title of Principal. followed by Rebecca Clarke.

Sport 
Walford is a member of the Independent Girls Schools Sports Association (IGSSA).

IGSSA premierships 
Walford has won the following IGSSA premierships.

 Athletics (2) - 2004, 2006
 Basketball (3) - 1993, 1994, 2007
 Hockey (4) - 1978, 2014, 2015, 2016
 Soccer - 2020
 Swimming (2) - 2008, 2009
 Tennis (10) - 2003, 2007, 2008, 2009, 2010, 2011, 2012, 2013, 2014, 2015
 Volleyball (2) - 2002, 2006

Notable alumnae
 Christine Adamson – Justice of the Supreme Court of New South Wales
 Frances Adamson – Governor of South Australia, previously Secretary, Australian Department of Foreign Affairs and Trade, and Australian Ambassador to China.
 Jennifer Cashmore – MHA of the South Australian State Parliament
 Taasha Coates – Singer, Songwriter and member of the band The Audreys
 Constance Margaret Eardley – botanist at the University of Adelaide 
 Isobel Marshall – 2021 Young Australian of the Year
 Margaret Clunies Ross – Professor of English Literature at the University of Sydney
 Pamela Sykes – Molecular Geneticist. Founding fellow of the Faculty of Science in the Royal College of pathologists of Australia
 Ann Vanstone – Independent Commissioner Against Corruption (South Australia)
 Ann Woolcock – Professor of Respiratory Medicine at the University of Sydney

See also
List of schools in South Australia
List of boarding schools
Head of the River (Australia)
Anglican Church of Australia

References

External links
Official website

Anglican primary schools in Adelaide
Anglican secondary schools in Adelaide
International Baccalaureate schools in Australia
Boarding schools in South Australia
Girls' schools in South Australia
Educational institutions established in 1893
Junior School Heads Association of Australia Member Schools
1893 establishments in Australia
Alliance of Girls' Schools Australasia